Andy Stirling (born 5 March 1990 in Paisley, Scotland) is a Scottish footballer who plays as a midfielder for Darvel F.C. Stirling has previously played for Stenhousemuir, East Stirlingshire, Kitsap Pumas, Dunfermline Athletic, Stirling Albion, Dumbarton, Queen of the South , Alloa Athletic and Stranraer F.C.

Career
Born in Paisley, Stirling signed a full-time contract with his local club St Mirren at sixteen years old and was released by the Buddies three years later.

Stirling signed for Scottish Second Division club Stenhousemuir and made over 40 appearances in two seasons.

Stirling then moved to local rivals East Stirlingshire. He was with the Shire for two seasons also. During this time, Stirling had a brief spell with Washington state club Kitsap Pumas.

Stirling returned to Scotland in July 2013 and signed for Scottish League One club Stranraer. After an impressive season at Stair Park he was included in the 2013–14 Scottish League One Team of the Year.

Stirling was then given the option to return to full-time football with League One rivals Dunfermline Athletic. In May 2014, Stirling became the Pars manager Jim Jefferies' third signing of the 2014 close season. After 15 appearances for the side, Stirling was sent out on loan to Stirling Albion with manager John Potter confirming the move had been sanctioned to give Stirling more first-team football. After an unsuccessful season with Dunfermline, Stirling was released by the East End Park club.

Stirling signed once again for Stranraer in May 2015. His first appearance after re-signing for the Stair Park club was in a 2–0 defeat versus Queen of the South in the Scottish Challenge Cup. Stirling's first goal for Stranraer was versus Ayr United in August 2015. After just one season with the Blues Stirling again moved on.

Stirling then signed for Scottish Championship club Dumbarton on a one-year contract. He scored his first goal for the Sons in a 1–1 draw versus his first club St Mirren in September 2016.

After impressing during the 2016–17 season against Queen of the South, Stirling signed a pre-contract with the Dumfries club on 24 April 2017, agreeing a two-year deal from the summer of 2017. Stirling scored his first league goal for the Doonhamers on 9 September 2017 in a 2–2 draw away to Livingston.

On 30 January 2018, Stirling returned to the Sons on loan from Queens until the end of the 2017–18 season.

On 19 June 2019, Stirling signed a one-year contract with Alloa Athletic. He left the club on 3 September 2019.

Career statistics

References

External links

Andy Stirling profile at dafc.co.uk

1990 births
Living people
Footballers from Paisley, Renfrewshire
Association football midfielders
Scottish footballers
St Mirren F.C. players
Stenhousemuir F.C. players
East Stirlingshire F.C. players
Kitsap Pumas players
Stranraer F.C. players
Dunfermline Athletic F.C. players
Stirling Albion F.C. players
Dumbarton F.C. players
West of Scotland Football League players
Queen of the South F.C. players
Scottish Football League players
Scottish Professional Football League players
USL League Two players
Scottish expatriate sportspeople in the United States
Expatriate soccer players in the United States
Scottish expatriate footballers
Alloa Athletic F.C. players